Washington: Behind Closed Doors is a 1977 American television miniseries produced by Paramount Television, that was broadcast in six parts, airing across six consecutive nights on ABC, between September 6 to September 11, 1977.

The fictional story is loosely based on John Ehrlichman's 1976 book The Company, a novel inspired by the author's tenure as a top aide in the Nixon administration.

Plot
The film is a lavish fictionalized re-telling of the Watergate story (loosely based on ex-Nixon aide John Ehrlichman's novel The Company) mixing political intrigue and personal drama and centering on the rise of a power-hungry American president and the men with whom he surrounds himself in order to keep his grip on his office. The story builds from a soap-opera start into a trenchant study of power that corrupts.

Primary cast
 Cliff Robertson as William Martin (Richard Helms, Director of Central Intelligence)
 Jason Robards as President Richard Monckton (Richard M. Nixon, 37th President)
 Stefanie Powers as Sally Whalen
 Robert Vaughn as Frank Flaherty (Harry R. Haldeman, White House Chief of Staff)
 Lois Nettleton as Linda Martin
 Barry Nelson as Bob Bailey
 Harold Gould as Carl Tessler (Henry Kissinger, Assistant to the President for National Security Affairs)
 Tony Bill as Adam Gardiner (Jeb Stuart Magruder, Special Assistant to the President)
 Andy Griffith as President Esker Scott Anderson (Lyndon B. Johnson, 36th President)
 John Houseman as Myron Dunn
 David Selby as Roger Castle
 Meg Foster as Jenny Jamison
 Peter Coffield as Eli McGinn
 Frances Lee McCain as Paula Stoner Gardiner
 Barry Primus as Joe Wisnovsky
 Diana Ewing as Kathy Ferris
 Lara Parker as Wanda Elliott
 John Lehne as Tucker Tallford (John Ehrlichman, Assistant to the President for Domestic Affairs)
 Alan Oppenheimer as Simon Cappell
 Nicholas Pryor as Hank Ferris (Ronald L. Ziegler, White House Press Secretary)
 Frank Marth as Lawrence Allison
 Thayer David as Elmer Morse (John Edgar Hoover,  Director of the Federal Bureau of Investigation)
 George Gaynes as Brewster Perry
 Linden Chiles as Jack Atherton 
 Skip Homeier as Lars Haglund
 John Randolph as Bennett Lowman
 Bonnie Bartlett as Joan Bailey
 Joseph Sirola as Peter Ozymandias
 Joseph Hacker as Jimmy Bird

Release
The 12 ½‐hour television miniseries was broadcast in 6 parts, airing across six consecutive nights on ABC from September 6 to September 11, 1977. The DVD was released on June 5, 2012.

The show did well in the Nielsen ratings.  The last segment (Sunday September 11) was the third-highest rated prime time program of the week (23.6 rating, 17.2 million homes); the Thursday episode was fourth (23 rating, 16.7 million); and the debut Tuesday episode ranked eighth (22 rating, or 16 million).  Other parts finished 16th (Friday), 17th (Wednesday), and 25th (Saturday; typically a low viewership night) for the same week.

Awards and nominations
Robert Vaughn received an Emmy Award for his performance as the President's Chief of Staff, with other nominations going to the show itself as Outstanding Series, to Jason Robards for his portrayal of President Richard Monckton with its overt Nixonian images, director Gary Nelson, cinematographers Joseph Biroc and Jack Swain, art directors Jack DeShields and Jamie Claytor and set decorator Barbara Kreiger.

 Primetime Emmy Award for Outstanding Supporting Actor in a Drama Series - Robert Vaughn (won)
 Primetime Emmy Award for Outstanding Miniseries (nominated)
 Primetime Emmy Award for Outstanding Lead Actor in a Miniseries or a Movie - Jason Robards (nominated)

References

External links

American Broadcasting Company original programming
1970s American television miniseries
Films directed by Gary Nelson
Films based on American novels
Works about American politics
American political drama films
Films about Richard Nixon
Films scored by Dominic Frontiere
Films scored by Richard Markowitz
Watergate scandal in film
Films à clef